Al-Zawiya was a Palestinian Arab village in the Safad Subdistrict. It was depopulated during the 1947–1948 Civil War in Mandatory Palestine on May 24, 1948, by the Palmach's First Battalion of Operation Yiftach. It was located 23 km northeast of Safad.

History
In the 1931 census of Palestine,  conducted by the British Mandate authorities, Ez Zawiya had a population of 590  Muslims,  in  a total of 141 houses.

In the  1945 statistics, the village had a population of 760.  with a total of 3,958  dunams of land (1 dunam=1000 square meters), according to an official land and population survey.   Of this, 3,593   dunums  were used for cereals; while a 195 dunams were classified as built-up, urban areas.

1948, aftermath
Zawiya became depopulated on  May 24, 1948, after expulsion by the Zionist forces.

References

Bibliography

External links
Welcome To al-Zawiya
al-Zawiya, Zochrot
Survey of Western Palestine, Map 4: IAA, Wikimedia commons

Arab villages depopulated during the 1948 Arab–Israeli War
District of Safad